The Muthi Muthi people are an indigenous Australian people whose traditional lands are located in the Northern Riverina and Far West regions of New South Wales.

The Muthi Muthi are the traditional owners of Nimmie Caira and the Lowbidgee and share custodial rights for Lake Mungo, Mungo Man and Mungo Lady with the neighbouring Paakantji and Ngiyampaa groups.

Language
The Mati Mati spoke Madhi Madhi, a Kulinic language, and, according to Barry Blake, one of a subgroup, the Mathi languages, of which Matdhi Madhi is the best known. The subgroup includes the related Watiwati Letjiletji languages. What is distinctive about it compared to the languages spoken by most contiguous peoples is that it lacks monosyllabic nouns.

Country
The Muthi Muthi lands stretched over an estimated 2,200 sq. m. (.), taking in the Murrumbidgee River in the area of Balranald, with their southwestern boundary on the Murray River. Their western extension ran cloise by to Lake Benanee. Their northern reaches lay to the west of Carrawatha]. Modern towns encompassed by their territory are Booligal, Oxley, Maude, Homebush, Clare, Kyalite, Tooleybuc, Koraleigh and Euston.

Running clockwise, their neighbours were the Parrintyi to the north, the YitaYita northeast, the Nari-Nari to the east, the Wati Wati on their southern flank, the Dadi Dadi on their southwestern frontier, and the Kureinji to their west.

Archaeological investigation has confirmed a tribal boundary in this location as this is the last known location of Muthi Muthi burial mounds.

Alternative names 
 Bakiin
 Madi-madi
 Mataua
 Matimati
 Matthee-matthee
 Moorta Moorta
 Muti muti
 Mutte Mutte
 Mutti Mutti

Source: ;

Native title
In 1997 a claim for Native Title was made for an area in the south of New South Wales.

Notable people
 Kutcha Edwards, a musician
 Mungo Man and Mungo Lady
 Ballandella and Tourandury
 Whitepeeper

Some words
 lénghi (camp)
 wanápi (fire)
 wuthúngi (man)

Source:

Notes

Citations

Sources

Aboriginal peoples of New South Wales